Usatov is a Russian masculine surname, its feminine counterpart is Usatova. Notable people with the surname include:

Dmitri Usatov (1847–1913), Russian tenor and vocal teacher
Nina Usatova (born 1951), Russian film and stage actress

Russian-language surnames